South Byron is an unincorporated community located, in the town of Byron, in Fond du Lac County, Wisconsin, United States.

References

Unincorporated communities in Fond du Lac County, Wisconsin
Unincorporated communities in Wisconsin